Harry Osterman (born April 14, 1967) is an American politician serving as a member of the Chicago City Council from the 48th ward. He previously served in the Illinois House of Representatives for the 14th District from 2000 to 2011.

Early life and education 
Born and raised in Chicago, Osterman graduated from Gordon Technical High School in 1985. He attended Illinois State University and Loyola University Chicago, but did not earn a degree.

Career 
Osterman began his career as an aide to 48th ward Alderman Mary Ann Smith, then he worked as a staff liaison to the Chicago Police Department and the Cook County State's Attorney’s Office.

Illinois House of Representatives
Osterman was originally appointed as to the state house to complete the term of Carol Ronen, who had been elected to the Illinois Senate.

Osterman represented the 14th district in the Illinois House of Representatives from 2000 until 2011, when he resigned to assume office as Chicago alderman.

Chicago City Council
Osterman was elected alderman for the 48th Ward in the 2011 Chicago aldermanic election to replace outgoing alderman Mary Ann Smith. He was reelected in 2015 and 2019. On July 15, 2022, Osterman announced he would not seek a 4th term as alderman.

During the mayoralty of Lori Lightfoot, Osterman has been considered an ally of Lightfoot on the City Council.

Personal life 
Harry Osterman's mother, Alderman Kathy Osterman represented the 48th Ward from 1987 to 1989.

References 

1967 births
21st-century American politicians
Chicago City Council members
Living people
Members of the Illinois House of Representatives